Rasheya Jasmin Luis (born September 4, 1973 in Pasig) is a Filipino sport shooter. She tied for 44th place in the women's 10 metre air rifle event at the 2000 Summer Olympics.

References

1973 births
Living people
ISSF rifle shooters
Filipino female sport shooters
Olympic shooters of the Philippines
Shooters at the 2000 Summer Olympics
People from Pasig